Fakes is a Canadian television comedy series, which premiered in 2022 on CBC Gem in Canada and Netflix internationally. The series stars Emilija Baranac and Jennifer Tong as Zoe and Rebecca, two teenagers in West Vancouver, British Columbia who launch what quickly becomes the largest fake ID empire in North America. The series premiered September 1, 2022.

Each episode is portrayed from the perspective of one of the two young women, making use of the unreliable narrator technique as their respective viewpoints sometimes contradict each other. Richard Harmon, who plays the supporting character Tryst, highlighted this aspect of the show as a fun creative opportunity for him as an actor, because it allowed him to play more than one variation on the character, based on the differing views of his character in each of the main characters' perspectives, instead of having to maintain a single consistent characterization.

The cast also includes Eric Bempong, Wern Lee, Matreya Scarrwener, Lauren K. Robek, Dylan Sloane, Mya Lowe, Ryan Mah, Emily Leung, Cindy Piper, Devon Slack, Oliver Rice, Debbie Podowski, Roraigh Falkner, Devon Alexander and Toby Hargrave.

The series received two Canadian Screen Award nominations at the 11th Canadian Screen Awards in 2023, for Best Comedy Series and Best Picture Editing in a Children's or Youth Program or Series (Sabrina Pitre). The series also received two Writer's Guild of Canada nominations for Best Writing in a Comedy Series in 2023.

Episodes

References

External links

2020s Canadian sitcoms
2022 Canadian television series debuts
CBC Gem original programming
Television shows filmed in British Columbia
Television shows set in British Columbia